The Saratoga Springs Utah Temple is a temple of the Church of Jesus Christ of Latter-day Saints under construction in Saratoga Springs, Utah.

History
The intent to construct the temple was announced by church president Thomas S. Monson on April 2, 2017, during the 187th annual general conference.  When completed, it will be the 18th temple in Utah.

On May 7, 2019, the church announced preliminary information on the temple's anticipated location and size. A groundbreaking, to signify beginning of construction, was held on October 19, 2019, with Craig C. Christensen, president of the church's Utah Area, presiding.

On November 21, 2022, the LDS Church announced that a public open house is scheduled to be held from April 15 through July 8, 2023, excluding Sundays. The temple is scheduled for dedication on August 13, 2023, with Henry B. Eyring, of the church's First Presidency, expected to preside.

See also

 The Church of Jesus Christ of Latter-day Saints in Utah
 Comparison of temples of The Church of Jesus Christ of Latter-day Saints
 List of temples of The Church of Jesus Christ of Latter-day Saints
 List of temples of The Church of Jesus Christ of Latter-day Saints by geographic region
 Temple architecture (Latter-day Saints)

References

External links
Saratoga Springs Utah Temple at ChurchofJesusChristTemples.org

Temples (LDS Church) in Utah